The Folks from Mother’s Mixer is a compilation of tracks recorded in the early 1970s by the band Black Merda. It was released by Tuff City Records in 2005 and collects all the tracks from the band’s two original albums, Black Merda (1970) and Long Burn the Fire (1972).

Track listing

 "Prophet" – 2:52
 "Think of Me" – 2:31
 "Cynthy-Ruth" – 3:03
 "Over and Over" – 5:29
 "Ashamed" – 3:50
 "Reality" – 1:59
 "Windsong" – 4:12
 "Good Luck" – 3:45
 "That’s the Way It Goes" – 3:15
 "I Don’t Want to Die" – 3:51
 "Set Me Free" – 0:28
 "For You" – 4:38
 "The Folks from Mother’s Mixer" – 4:09
 "My Mistake" – 5:25
 "Lying" – 4:25
 "Long Burn the Fire" – 3:21
 "Sometimes I Wish" – 3:45
 "I Got a Woman" – 4:53
 "We Made Up" – 3:41

Note: Tracks 1-11 are from the album Black Merda and tracks 12-19 are from the album Long Burn the Fire.

Personnel
Anthony Hawkins – guitar, vocals 
VC L. Veasey – bass, vocals 
Charles Hawkins – guitar, vocals 
Tyrone Hite – drums, vocals (tracks 1-11) 
Bob Crowder – drums (tracks 12-19)

References

Black Merda albums
2005 compilation albums
Acid rock albums